Louis-Marie de Carné (17 February 1804, Quimper, Finistère – 11 February 1876, Plomelin), comte de Carné was a French politician, journalist and historian.

Biography
Founder of the newspaper le Correspondant in 1829, conseiller général for Finistère, député from 1839 to  1846, he was also a contributor to the Journal des débats and the Revue des deux mondes as well as  one of the founders of the Société d'économie charitable and of the Société internationale des études pratiques d'économie sociale. Supported by the opponents of the Second French Empire (Montalembert, Dupanloup, Guizot), he was elected to the Académie française le 23 avril 1863, on the third scrutiny, against Émile Littré.

He was president of the Société archéologique du Finistère until his death.

Works
Vues sur l'histoire contemporaine (1833)
Guiscriff, scènes de la Terreur dans une paroisse bretonne, précédé d'une notice historique sur la chouannerie (1835)
Des Intérêts nouveaux en Europe depuis la révolution de 1830 (1838)
Du Gouvernement représentatif en France et en Angleterre (1841)
Études sur les fondateurs de l'unité nationale en France (1842)
Études sur l'histoire du gouvernement représentatif en France, de 1789 à 1848 (1855)
Les Fondateurs de l'unité française : Suger, saint Louis, Duguesclin, Jeanne d'Arc, Louis XI, Henri IV, Richelieu, Mazarin. Études historiques (1856)
La Monarchie française au dix-huitième siècle, étude historiques sur les règnes de Louis XIV et de Louis XV (1859)
L'Europe et le second Empire (1865)
Les États de Bretagne et l'administration de cette province jusqu'en 1789 (1868) - Son ouvrage fondamental [...] toujours apprécié aujourd'hui
Souvenirs de ma jeunesse au temps de la Restauration (1872).

References
 In Brittany no less than six streets are named after him (Louis-Marie de Carné-Marcein), according to Les Noms qui ont fait l'histoire de Bretagne, 1997.

External links
 Académie française
 Works by Louis de Carné on Wikisource

1804 births
1876 deaths
Writers from Quimper
Politicians from Quimper
19th-century French historians
19th-century French journalists
French male journalists
French male writers
19th-century French male writers